Kathleen Connor Howell is an American scientist and aerospace engineer known for her contributions to dynamical systems theory applied to spacecraft trajectory design which led to the use of halo orbit in multiple NASA space missions. She is currently the Hsu Lo Distinguished Professor at Purdue University in the School of Aeronautics and Astronautics. In acknowledgment of her many achievements, Discover magazine recognized her in 2002 as one of the 50 most important women in science.

Career
She obtained her Bachelor of Science degree in Aerospace Engineering at Iowa State University in 1973. Howell then received her MS and PhD degrees from  Stanford University in 1977 and 1983, respectively. Her PhD advisor was John Breakwell and her PhD dissertation was entitled "Three-dimensional, periodic halo orbits in the restricted three-body problem". Howell started as an assistant professor at Purdue University School of Aeronautics and Astronautics in 1982 and is  the School's first female tenured professor.

Howell's work on computing the characteristics of the invariant manifolds associated with halo orbits was first applied for design of trajectory for  Genesis mission and enabling low-energy sample return from Sun-Earth L1 point. The spacecraft trajectory for Genesis exploiting Howell's manifold method was computed by Howell and her student Brian Barden during a weekend in August 1996 after an urgent  request from Jet Propulsion Lab scientist Martin Lo.

Awards and honors
Howell is a 1984 winner of the 1984 Presidential Young Investigator Award, presented to her at the White House by Ronald Reagan, and the 2004 recipient of the Dirk Brouwer Award from the American Astronautical Society.

In 2017 Kathleen Howell was elected to National Academy of Engineering with a citation "For contributions in dynamical systems theory and invariant manifolds culminating in optimal interplanetary trajectories and the Interplanetary Superhighway".

Papers 
 "Three-Dimensional, Periodic, 'Halo' Orbits"

References

External links
 Purdue Faculty Page for Kathleen Howell
 Howell's Moving Orbits, web page explaining Howell's doctoral research by Greg Egan

Purdue University faculty
Living people
Members of the United States National Academy of Engineering
Year of birth missing (living people)
American aerospace engineers
Iowa State University alumni
Stanford University alumni
Women rocket scientists